The five National Collections of Scotland are overseen and funded by the Scottish Government.  They are responsible for collecting and publicly exhibiting items and archives of national and international importance.

The National Collections are:
 National Library of Scotland
 National Museums Scotland
 National Galleries of Scotland
 National Records of Scotland
 Historic Environment Scotland

References